Frederick William Luderus (September 12, 1885 – January 5, 1961) was an American professional baseball player who played first base in the major leagues from 1909 to 1920 for the Philadelphia Phillies and Chicago Cubs.

Luderus was a member of the 1915 Phillies team that won the National League pennant. He was the first Phillie to hit a home run in the World Series.

He rebuilt his home in Three Lakes, Wisconsin, with the help of architect, neighbor and Phillies teammate Cy Williams.

In a 12-year, 1346-game major league career, Luderus compiled a .277 batting average (1344-for-4851) with 570 runs, 251 doubles, 54 triples, 84 home runs, 642 RBI, 414 base on balls, 429 strikeouts, .340 on-base percentage and .403 slugging percentage. He recorded a .986 fielding percentage as a first baseman. In the 1915 World Series he batted .438 (7-for-16) with 6 RBI and hit the only home run for the Phillies in Game 5.

References

External links

1885 births
1961 deaths
Major League Baseball first basemen
Chicago Cubs players
Philadelphia Phillies players
Winnipeg Maroons (baseball) players
Freeport Pretzels players
Toledo Mud Hens managers
Toledo Mud Hens players
Kansas City Blues (baseball) players
Oklahoma City Indians players
Shreveport Sports players
Omaha Crickets players
Sault Ste. Marie Soos players
Baseball players from Milwaukee
People from Three Lakes, Wisconsin